Dikeledi Moropane (born 12 March 1976) is a retired South African sprinter who specialized in the 400 metres.

Her biggest outing was the 2001 World Championships, where she competed in the 100 metres without reaching the final.

At the 1999 All-Africa Games she competed in the 100 metres, and the South African team finished fourth in the 4 × 100 metres relay. At the 2003 All-Africa Games she competed in the 100 metres and won a silver medal in the 4 × 100 metres relay. At the 2004 African Championships she competed in the 100 metres and won a silver medal in the 4 × 100 metres relay.

Her personal best time was 11.38 seconds, achieved in February 2000 in Pretoria.

References

1976 births
Living people
South African female sprinters
World Athletics Championships athletes for South Africa
African Games silver medalists for South Africa
African Games medalists in athletics (track and field)
Athletes (track and field) at the 2003 All-Africa Games
21st-century South African women